The Stalingrad Campaign is a 1986 video game published by Simulations Canada.

Gameplay
The Stalingrad Campaign is a game in which the Russian Southern Front between June 1942 and February 1943 is featured in a text-only simulation.

Development
Released in 1987, The Stalingrad Campaign was designed by Bill Nichols and published by Simulations Canada.

Reception
M. Evan Brooks reviewed the game for Computer Gaming World, and stated that "Simulations Canada's hybrid of board and computer wargames is an interesting concept. While not part of the mainstream in either sphere, the company has staked out a small niche of dedicated gamers. The basic problem with board and counter assists to the computer is a space consideration. Most computer owners do not have the space next to their computer for easy accessibility."

In Computer Gaming Worlds 1993 survey of computer wargames, The Stalingrad Campaign received a score of one star out of five. The magazine remarked that The Stalingrad Campaign "fails due to a poor interface, poor documentation, and the inability of the game to deliver any semblance of player participation."

References

External links

Article in Commodore Magazine

1986 video games
Apple II games
Atari ST games
Commodore 64 games
Computer wargames
DOS games
Simulations Canada video games
Turn-based strategy video games
Video games about Nazi Germany
Video games developed in Canada
Video games set in the Soviet Union
Works about the Battle of Stalingrad
World War II video games